Walter Heuer may refer to:
Walter Heuer (proofreader) (1908–1977), Swiss proofreader and writer on the German language
Walter Heuer (sailor) (1892 – death date unknown), Brazilian sailor at the 1936 Summer Olympics